Chiastic Slide is the fourth studio album by the British electronic music group Autechre, released 17 February 1997 by Warp Records. The album saw the duo continue to move further away from the ambient techno sound of their early releases, employing harsher, glitchier beats. Though not initially met with the same critical acclaim as Tri Repetae or LP5, Chiastic Slide was eventually recognized by critics as an innovative and "enormously influential" album.

Release
Chiastic Slide was released on 17 February 1997. It did not receive a release in the United States until Warp Records began distributing its own releases there in 2001.  Autechre referenced the fourth track, "Cichli", in the name of their subsequent EP Cichlisuite (1997).  The sleeve was designed by Sheffield-based design agency The Designers Republic.

Reception

Allmusic critic John Bush panned Chiastic Slide as being an underwhelming follow-up to 1995's Tri Repetae, saying it was too repetitive and lacked ideas. Tim Barr in Techno: the Rough Guide called Chiastic Slide "The aural equivalent of being at the bottom of the sea." He went on to say the album was "Dark, claustrophobic... yet full of strange beauty".

A 2017 FACT Magazine retrospective described Chiastic Slide as "an enduring classic" that marks "the axis point around which all of Autechre's work revolves," representing a "break from contemporaneous orthodoxy" in electronic music and sound composition. In an interview with Popular 1 Magazine, guitarist Kavus Torabi of Cardiacs named Chiastic Slide as one of his favourite albums.

Track listing

References

External links
 Chiastic Slide at the official Warp website.

Autechre albums
1997 albums
Warp (record label) albums
Albums with cover art by The Designers Republic